Vilafranca is a municipality in the comarca of Ports, in the province of Castellón, Valencian Community, Spain. Prior to 2022, it was part of a different comarca, l'Alt Maestrat. Its official Spanish language name is Villafranca del Cid.

Geography
The royal town of Villafranca del Cid is situated on the western boundary of the province of Castellón, 95 km from the capital. The village lies on a high plateau at 1,125 m above sea level. Despite this, the rest of the term is very rugged, most notably the main point "'Tossal dels Montllats'" (1.643 m), "'Tossal del Mas de Coder'" (1467 m), "'Tossal del Mas d'Altava'" (1426 m), "'Tossal del Mas de Tosca de Dalt'" (1379 m), "'Tossal d'Arriello' "(1314 m) and the side of" 'Canto del Picaio' "(1305 m). By contrast the lower part is in the Río Monleón 710 m. above sea level. The highest points are basically formed by limestone erosion that has beveled sometimes deeply. The dissolution of limestone has managed whimsical molded in " Les Coves del Forcall '.'"

You reach this location from Castellón taking the CV-10 and the CV-15.

Neighboring localities
The town of Villafranca del Cid limited with the following locations: 
Portell de Morella, Castellfort, Ares del Maestrat, Benassal and Vistabella del Maestrat all inside the province of Castellón, Mosqueruela and La Iglesuela del Cid inside the province of Teruel.

History
Its origins are lost in the prehistory. So say the town of Bronze Age of "Ereta Castellar" numerous Iberian sites that dot the term, occasional rock paintings and historically remains Roman found (old secondary roads, imperial coins, etc.). But the birth of the current Villafranca was dated February 7, 1239. Its founder was Don Blasco de Alagon, which he called "'Rivus Truitarum'" or " Riu de les Truites'" (Rio de las Truchas in Castilian). The Gothic-Roman bridge across the "Riu de les Truites" which was the king Jaime I crossed and first set foot on the land of Castellon.

After belonging to the house of Alagon, of Anglesola after and again to Alagon, he joined the "Términos Generales del Castillo de Morella" on May 14, 1303. On December 27, 1333, the people from Vilafranca rebelled against the decisions of Morella's juries, starting with this act the struggle for independence that lasted nearly four centuries and other villages joined.

There were a number of lawsuits with Mosqueruela losing Mallo castle and the village of Estrella between 1335 and 1340.

King Pedro IV of Aragon authorized the construction of walls and granted independence to Morella on June 8, 1358; but eleven years later he changed his mind and canceled the privilege. Felipe IV understood the financial burden posed this to the villages, and in payment for services rendered by the villagers in the wars of France and Catalonia, the independent will.

Joan Baptista Penyarroja of Carlos II was the notary who succeeded the independence of all the villages and the erection in royal villas February 8, 1691.

In the Succession War, the town took the side of Archduke Charles of Austria.

Although there was always an important traditionalist core and was the son of the village as the famous guerrilla "El Serrador" Villafranca took part by liberals Elizabeth II; but Cabrera took her by surprise in 1834. Then it was another strong liberal stronghold again until being abandoned, as it was trapped between the Carlist domains. This battle has been considered as the beginning of the end of the war in the centre of Spain and Valencia.

In 1943 the provincial council (diputación provincial) mostly choose the mayor of Vilafranca, Juan Antonio Aznar Inigo, for the position of procurador (member of the Cortes) in the I Legislature of the Cortes Españolas (1943-1946), representing the municipalities of the province.

References

Municipalities in the Province of Castellón
Ports (comarca)
Maestrazgo